The Cherry Creek School District 5, also known as Cherry Creek Public Schools, is a school district located in western Arapahoe County, Colorado. The current superintendent is Christopher Smith. Former superintendent Scott Siegfried, Ph.D. announced his retirement on January 22, 2021.
It consists of elementary, middle, and high schools. The district headquarters are in Greenwood Village.

The district serves more than 54,000 children and more 300,000 residents in 108 square miles that spread across seven municipalities. The district serves portions of Aurora and Centennial, which make up its majority. The district also encompasses Foxfield and Glendale, as well as most of Cherry Hills Village, portions of Greenwood Village and Englewood, and adjoining areas of unincorporated Arapahoe County.

History
Cherry Creek School District No. 5 was voted into existence in 1950 by residents of seven Arapahoe County school districts. Existing schools in the new district included:
 Melvin School, currently a schoolhouse museum on the Smoky Hill High School campus
 Castlewood School, dismantled when I-25 was built and replaced with Belleview Elementary in 1954
 Cherry Creek Elementary School
 Cherry Hills Elementary School 

CCSD now comprises 42 elementary schools, 10 middle schools and six high schools, in addition to an alternative high school, a magnet school and two charter schools. District enrollment now exceeds 54,200, and the first class of school room instructors has grown to about 3,700 teachers. 

In 2022, the district announced that it would discontinue the practice of recognizing valedictorians, starting with the class of 2026.

Institute of Science and Technology
In 2011, the district opened the Institute of Science and Technology, a campus devoted specifically to science, technology, engineering and math (STEM) education. The building, located at 12500 E. Jewell Avenue in Aurora, is part of the Overland High School-Prairie Middle School campus.  It serves Overland and Prairie students through a rich and rigorous curriculum. 

The school was designed by Hutton Architecture Studio and built by Saunders Construction. Approved by Cherry Creek voters in 2008, the $18 million, 58,000 square foot facility features lines of latitude and longitude on the floors, galaxies of stars on the ceilings, and windows that represent Fibonacci's sequence.

Schools

Elementary schools
Altitude Elementary School 
Antelope Ridge Elementary School
Arrowhead Elementary School
Aspen Crossing Elementary School
Belleview Elementary School
Black Forest Hills Elementary School
Buffalo Trail Elementary School
Canyon Creek Elementary School
Challenge (K-8 Magnet) Middle School
Cherry Creek Academy K-5 (Charter)
Cherry Hills Village Elementary School
Cimarron Elementary School
Cottonwood Creek Elementary School
Coyote Hills Elementary School
Creekside Elementary School
Dakota Valley Elementary School
Dry Creek Elementary School
Eastridge Community Elementary School
Fox Hollow Elementary School
Greenwood Elementary School
Heritage Elementary School
High Plains Elementary School
Highline Community Elementary School
Holly Hills Elementary School
Homestead Elementary School
Independence Elementary School
Indian Ridge Elementary School
Meadow Point Elementary School
Mission Viejo Elementary School
Mountain Vista Elementary School
Peakview Elementary School
Pine Ridge Elementary School
Polton Elementary School
Ponderosa Elementary School
Red Hawk Ridge Elementary School
Rolling Hills Elementary School
Sagebrush Elementary School
Summit Elementary School
Sunrise Elementary School
Timberline Elementary School
Trails West Elementary School
Village East Elementary School
Walnut Hills Elementary School
Willow Creek Elementary School
Woodland Elementary School

Middle schools
Campus Middle School
Colorado Skies Academy
Falcon Creek Middle School
Fox Ridge Middle School
Horizon Community Middle School
Infinity Middle School
Laredo Middle School
Liberty Middle School
Prairie Middle School
Sky Vista Middle School
Thunder Ridge Middle School
West Middle School

High schools
Cherokee Trail High School
Cherry Creek High School
Eaglecrest High School
Grandview High School
Overland High School
Smoky Hill High School

Alternative programs
Career and Technical Education
Cherry Creek Academy (K-8 Charter)
Endeavor Academy Alternative High School
Foote Youth Services Center
Glendale Educational Center
Heritage Heights Academy (K-8 Charter)
Institute of Science and Technology
Joliet Center
Rocky Mountain School of Expeditionary Learning
Cherry Creek Innovation Center (CCIC)

References

External links

Cherry Creek School District

 
School districts established in 1950
Education in Aurora, Colorado
1950 establishments in Colorado